The 2012 FIBA World Olympic Qualifying Tournament was a men's basketball tournament that consisted of 12 national teams, where the top three teams earned a place in the 2012 Olympics basketball tournament. It was held on 2–8 July 2012 in Caracas, Venezuela.

Lithuania, Russia and Nigeria qualified for the 2012 Olympics through this tournament.

Qualifying 
The best non-champions from each of FIBA's 2011 continental championships qualified for this tournament.

 2011 FIBA Africa Championship
 
 
 2011 FIBA Americas Championship
 
 
 
 2011 FIBA Asia Championship
 
 

 2011 FIBA EuroBasket
 
 
 
 
 2011 FIBA Oceania Championship

Host selection 
Only the teams that qualified were allowed to bid for hosting. Venezuela were chosen over Angola, Macedonia and Lithuania. The host was determined on a meeting of the FIBA Central Board held on 10–11 December 2011 in Madrid, Spain.

Participating nations
The teams were divided into three pots, corresponding to their continental zones: The draw was held on 31 January 2012 in Caracas.

Format
The teams were divided into four groups (Groups A-D) for the preliminary round.
Round robin for the preliminary round; the top two teams from each group advanced to the quarterfinals. The last-placed team in each group was eliminated.
A single-elimination tournament was then be held; the quarterfinals pairings were:
A1 vs. B2
B1 vs. A2
C1 vs. D2
D1 vs. C2
The semifinal pairings were A1/B2 vs. C1/D2 and B1/A2 vs. D1/C2. The semifinal winners qualified for the Olympics. No championship game was held.
The semifinal losers played for the last Olympic qualifying berth.

Squads

Preliminary round

All times are local (UTC−04:30)

Group A

Group B

Group C

Group D

Knockout stage

Quarterfinals

Semifinals

Third place match

Final standings

See also
Basketball at the 2012 Summer Olympics
2012 FIBA World Olympic Qualifying Tournament for Women

References

External links
 Olympic Basketball Tournament Road to London 2012
 2012 FIBA World Olympic Qualifying Tournament - Group Standings

2012
Qualifying
International basketball competitions hosted by Venezuela
Sports competitions in Caracas
2012 in Venezuelan sport
July 2012 sports events in South America
21st century in Caracas